James Pearson VC (2 October 1822 – 23 January 1900) was an Irish recipient of the Victoria Cross, the highest and most prestigious award for gallantry in the face of the enemy that can be awarded to British and Commonwealth forces.

He was 35 years old, and a private in the 86th Regiment of Foot (later The Royal Irish Rifles), British Army during the Indian Mutiny when the following deed took place on 3 April 1858 at Jhansi for which he was awarded the VC:

Pearson went on to achieve the rank of Sergeant.

References

1822 births
1900 deaths
19th-century Irish people
People from County Laois
Irish recipients of the Victoria Cross
Royal Ulster Rifles soldiers
Indian Rebellion of 1857 recipients of the Victoria Cross
Essex Regiment soldiers
Irish soldiers in the British Army
British Army recipients of the Victoria Cross
Military personnel from County Laois